Shin Da-eun (born January 7, 1985) is a South Korean actress. She starred in the television series The Sons (2012), A Little Love Never Hurts (2013) and The Return of Hwang Geum-bok (2015).

Personal life
In 2016, she married designer Im Sung-bin. On December 6, 2021, Shin announced on her Instagram that she was pregnant after 5 years of marriage. 

On April 22, 2022, it was confirmed that Shin had given birth to his first son.

Filmography

Television series

Film

Music video

Theater

Awards and nominations

References

External links

1985 births
Living people
South Korean television actresses
South Korean film actresses
South Korean stage actresses
South Korean musical theatre actresses
L&Holdings artists